Queen Elvis is the seventh studio album by English musician Robyn Hitchcock, released on A&M Records in 1989. It is his fourth studio album to be released with his band The Egyptians.

Having signed to A&M in 1988, this second set for the label was unreleased in Hitchcock's home country the UK. The album's cover depicts Hitchcock in a red telephone box, illuminated from the inside. Tracks 11 and 12 below are remixes of 2 album tracks ("Veins of the Queen" and "Freeze"), and were included on the original A&M US CD release.

The track "Queen Elvis" appears on his next album, Eye, with a second version "Queen Elvis II" available as a bonus track.

Track listing
All songs written by Robyn Hitchcock.

 "Madonna of the Wasps" – 3:05
 "The Devils Coachman" – 2:33
 "Wax Doll" – 4:12
 "Knife" – 3:24
 "Swirling" – 3:38
 "One Long Pair of Eyes" – 4:57
 "Veins of the Queen" – 3:24
 "Freeze" – 4:46
 "Autumn Sea" – 4:23
 "Superman" – 3:48
 "Veins of the Queen" (Royal mix) – 4:00
 "Freeze" (Shatter mix) – 4:16

Charts

References

Robyn Hitchcock albums
1989 albums
A&M Records albums
Albums produced by Robyn Hitchcock